Jacobus Nicolaas Scheepers (born 27 February 1990) is a South African rugby union footballer. His regular playing position is either full-back or winger.

He joined  on loan for the 2013 Currie Cup Premier Division competition, eventually remaining in Kimberley until the end of 2014.

Scheepers then retired from rugby to return to his family's citrus and potato farm, but reversed his decision a few months later to join Welkom-based side  for the 2015 Currie Cup First Division.

He joined Wellington-based side  for the 2016 season.

References

External links

itsrugby.co.uk profile

Living people
1990 births
South African rugby union players
Rugby union fullbacks
Rugby union players from Port Elizabeth
Afrikaner people
South African people of Dutch descent
Cheetahs (rugby union) players
Free State Cheetahs players
South Africa Under-20 international rugby union players